Âşık Ali İzzet Özkan (1902-1981) was a Turkish ashik and poet. A native of Şarkışla, Özkan became an ashik at a young age, and went to Adana at the age of 22 to compete with other ashiks from Çukurova. Özkan wandered throughout Turkey for many years and composer numerous original poems. He also participated in the festival of Turkish ashiks held in Konya.

See also 
 List of Turkic-languages poets

References

Composers of Turkish makam music
Turkish folk poets
Ashiks
1902 births
1981 deaths
People from Şarkışla
20th-century Turkish male singers